The 2014–15 season was Al Shorta's 41st season in the Iraqi Premier League, having featured in all 41 editions of the competition. Al Shorta participated in the Iraqi Premier League and the AFC Cup.

They entered this season on the back of two successful seasons for the club. The 2012–13 season saw them win both the Baghdad Cup and the Iraqi Premier League and the 2013–14 season saw them top the Iraqi Premier League standings again.

This season was not as successful as Al Shorta finished in third place in the league. They started the season brilliantly by storming to first place in Group 2 with 40 points from a possible 48, but they were knocked out at the elite stage after replacing Egyptian coach Mohamed Youssef with former manager Thair Jassam, finishing three points behind Naft Al Wasat (who reached the final and went on to win the league) in Group 1. Al Shorta were awarded a 3–0 win over Al Minaa in the third place match as Al Minaa did not turn up to the game, so Al Shorta finished in third.

In the AFC Cup, Al Shorta topped their group, reaching the knockout stage for the first time in their history. However, they were eliminated by Al Kuwait in the round of 16.

Squad

Out on loan

 (at Amanat Baghdad until the end of the 2014-15 season)

Departed during season

Personnel

Technical Staff

Management

Kit
Supplier: Nike / Sponsor: Royal Arena Sport

Transfers

In

Out

Competitions

Iraqi Premier League

Group stage (group 2)

Elite Stage (Group 1)

Third-place match

AFC Cup

Group stage

Knockout phase

Round of 16

Tournament for the Armed Forces

Basketball
Al Shorta won the Iraqi Division I Basketball League for the first time since 1997 by defeating Al Karkh in the final. The first leg of the final ended in a 66–65 win, the second ended in a 75–70 loss and the final leg ended in a 90–89 win thanks to a 3-pointer right at the end of the game from DeAndre Rice.

References

External links
Al Shorta website
Al Shorta TV
Team info at goalzz.com

Al-Shorta SC seasons
Al Shorta

ar:نادي الشرطة العراقي
ca:Al-Shorta FC Bagdad
es:Al-Shorta
fr:Police Club (Bagdad)
it:Al-Shorta Football Club
nl:Al Shorta